Kuwait have appeared in the finals of the FIFA World Cup on one occasion in 1982.

Overall record

<div style="text-align:left">

Kuwait at Spain 1982

Group 4

Record players
Coach Parreira fielded his first-choice players during Kuwait's three matches, resulting in ten players sharing the record for Kuwait's player with the most FIFA World Cup matches.

Goalscorers
Two Kuwaiti players scored one goal each during the 1982 FIFA World Cup.

 
Countries at the FIFA World Cup
FIFA